Alexander Jakubov (born 11 January 1991) is a Czech professional footballer who plays as a forward for Vlašim.

Club career
Jakubov made his professional debut for Senica on 13 July 2013 against Spartak Trnava. He joined Vlašim in July 2019.

References

External links
FK Senica profile
Sparta Prague profile
Eurofotbal profile

1991 births
Living people
Slovak footballers
Association football forwards
AC Sparta Prague players
FK Senica players
FC Sellier & Bellot Vlašim players
Slovak Super Liga players
Footballers from Prague
FK Varnsdorf players
FC Baník Ostrava players
FK Ústí nad Labem players
FC Fastav Zlín players
Czech National Football League players
FSV Budissa Bautzen players
Expatriate footballers in the Czech Republic
Expatriate footballers in Germany
Slovak expatriate sportspeople in Germany
Slovak expatriate sportspeople in the Czech Republic